Charles Pierre Dejean, vicomte (16 February 1807, Paris – 30 July 1872, Paris) was a French general and politician .

Life
He was the son of General Pierre François Marie Auguste Dejean.  He was Major General of Engineering, and State Councilor and on 20 July 1870, became Minister of War ad interim as a replacement of Marshal Leboeuf, who became chief to the General Staff of Army of the Rhine. Dejean served as Minister of War ad interim from 20 July 1870 to 10 August 1870 in Government of Émile Ollivier. He was a member of the Committee of Fortifications at his elevation to the rank of Grand Officer of the Legion of Honor on 29 April 1871.

References

1807 births
1872 deaths
Politicians from Paris
Viscounts of France
French Ministers of War
19th-century French politicians
People of the Second French Empire
Grand Officiers of the Légion d'honneur